Mountain Fever Records is a record label based in Willis, Virginia specializing primarily in bluegrass music.

History
The label was established by Mark Hodges, a Floyd County, Virginia native. He opened the Something To Do Video store, which he turned into a successful chain of stores. As a hobby, he began to record his musician friends when they would visit, and he turned this hobby into a stand-alone 72-track recording studio, and then the record label.

Sammy Shelor of the Lonesome River Band and Aaron Ramsey of Mountain Heart have engineered and mastered Mountain Fever projects.

Notable projects
In 2017, Mountain Fever Records released the Mac Wiseman album I Sang the Song (Life of the Voice with a Heart) featuring contributions from John Prine, Alison Krauss, Sierra Hull, Junior Sisk, Shawn Camp, and Andrea Zonn.

Travianna Records
Travianna Records is a child label for releasing Americana music. After Jack, Ash Breeze, Pi Jacobs, and Tara Dente are among the Travianna Records artists. The label was named after the late Samuel A’Court's communal farm Travianna in Floyd County.

Artists
Here is a partial list of artists who have released recordings on the Mountain Fever label.
 Dave Adkins
 Adkins & Loudermilk
 Alan Bibey and Grasstowne
 Ashlee Blankenship and Blades of Blue
 The Bluegrass Brothers
 Breaking Grass
 Summer Brooke and Mountain Faith
 Rachel Burge and Blue Dawning
 The Churchmen
 Amanda Cook
 Kristy Cox
 Crowe Brothers
 Jason Davis
 The Deer Creek Boys
 Delta Reign
 Detour
 Gold Heart Sisters
 Heidi and Ryan (Greer)
 Hammertowne
 Jett’s Creek
 Thomm Jutz
 Irene Kelley
 Nothin' Fancy
 Wyatt Rice
 The Wyatt Rice and Dan Menzone Alliance
 Kevin Richardson and Cuttin' Edge
 Sideline
 Junior Sisk and Rambler's Choice
 The Spinney Brothers
 Statement
 Stevens Family
 Sweet Potato Pie
 Volume Five
 Darrell Webb Band
 Mac Wiseman

See also 
 List of record labels

References

External links
 
 
 

American record labels
American independent record labels